Strovolos is a municipality of Nicosia District. With a population of nearly 70,000, it is the second most populated municipality in Cyprus, after Limassol, and the most populated municipality of Nicosia District. It was established in 1986.

Strovolos is now a town covering  divided into six parishes: Chryseleousa, Ayios Demetrios, Apostolos Varnavas kai Ayios Makarios, Ayios Vasilios, National Martyr Kyprianos and Stavros.

History
The name Strovolos is said to originate from the Greek word "strovilos" (Στρόβιλος) as in "anemo-strovilos" which means whirlwind or twister. There are references to Strovolos or Strovilos as early as the Middle Ages from the well-known medieval chronicler Leontios Makhairas, and from Florius Boustronius a little later.  According to these sources, Strovolos was a royal field during the years of Frankish Rule.  A major and definitive figure in the history of Strovolos was the National Martyr, Archbishop Kyprianos, who before the 1821 Revolution in Greece, contributed greatly to the preservation of the Greek spirit and Christianity.  The Turks hanged Archbishop Kyprianos and other high priests and dignitaries of Cyprus on 9 July 1821.

Strovolos evolved into its present form after the  events of 1974, when Turkey invaded Cyprus and occupied 38% of the island’s territory. This led to the settlement of many refugees within the Municipality.

The Chryseleousa parish was named after the Greek orthodox church of the same name that was built around the 12th Century.

Former mayors 
1986–1996: Iosif Hadjiosif
1997–2012: Savvas Eliofotou
2012–2016: Dr Lazaros S. Savvides
2017–present: Andreas Papacharalambous

Municipal Theater

The Municipal Theatre and the Music Hall of the Municipality of Strovolos has been designed so as to host a broad amount of artistic activities such as concerts, operas, ballets, and theatre performances. Its size is for about 870 people including seats for people with special needs. This place has been designed with high standards. Particular attention has been paid to the study and implementation of the acoustic demands. Up to today the acoustic results have been proved to be very good according to the positive comments and the enthusiasm of the musical conductors, the soloists, and of the musicians who participated in several activities in the Hall.

In 2014 the busts of Vasilis Michaelides and Demetris Lipertis, which had been placed outside the theater in 2013 were inaugurated at a ceremony which also celebrated El Greco. So a current photo in this article could update the existing one (this phrase should also change accordingly when the new photo is in place).

The whole set of buildings has a big reception place which is connected with the reception place of the Municipal Building, modern and comfortable dressing rooms with hygienic places, a modern practice hall, a refreshment room for the artists, offices and storing places. It has all the equipment that is necessary for the successful organization and attendance of performances.

For the development of athletics, an area for which the Municipality of Strovolos has a long tradition, the Municipality established the Municipal Athletic Center in which, among other facilities, includes four (4) futsal pitches, a mini football pitch, a running track and four (4) tennis courts.

Environment

In the area of Strovolos Municipality, 65 organized parks have been created as spaces for the entertainment of the citizens. More than 250 green places have been created, 340,000m² in total, while at the same time approximately 40,000 trees were planted in public areas, municipal parking lots and other areas. There are 32 organized green areas with amphitheatres, lakes, fountains and 65 playgrounds.

The biggest and best parks are those of Acropolis and Ayios Demetrios which are one of a kind.

Social policy and welfare

The Municipality of Strovolos has also played a pioneer role in other areas such as social services, with the establishment of a club for the elderly in which specialized people offer their care to the elder people. Youth clubs for the recreation and education of primary children have also been established. In addition, the Municipality of Strovolos has established a Counseling Center that offers free services on issues of mental health, addictive substances, marriage, family, etc. The Center also organizes different activities for a financial support for those who suffer. On Christmas and New Year’s Day and at Easter, the Mayor and members of the Municipal Council visit charitable institutions of Strovolos and offer presents and sweets. In the area of health among other matters, a complete programme of preventive medicine has been put into action, for the students of primary and High Schools.

Education
The municipality of Strovolos has several elementary schools and a gymnasium. There are two private schools in the area, the GC School of Careers and The English School.

Sports
Strovolos is home to Keravnos B.C., former Cypriot basketball champion. The team plays its home games at the Costas Papaellinas Arena.

International relations

Twin towns – sister cities
Strovolos is twinned with:
 Veria, Greece (1993)

References

External links
Official website

Municipalities in Nicosia District
Suburbs of Nicosia
Nicosia